Angus is an unincorporated community in the town of Cedar Lake, Barron County, Wisconsin, United States.

History
Angus was laid out in 1906. A post office called Angus was established in 1906, and remained in operation until it was discontinued in 1942. The community was named for Angus Cameron, a United States Senator from Wisconsin.

References

Unincorporated communities in Barron County, Wisconsin
Unincorporated communities in Wisconsin